Bachana Khorava (Georgian: ბაჩანა ხორავა; born 15 March 1993) is a Georgian athlete specialising in the long jump. He represented his country at the 2016 Summer Olympics in Rio de Janeiro. In addition, he won the long jump competition as part of team Georgia at the 2015 European Games (European Team Championships Third League) and won the bronze at the 2015 European U23 Championships. Earlier in his career he competed primarily in sprinting events.

His personal bests in the long jump are 8.02 metres outdoors (+1.0 m/s, Marsa 2016) and 8.25 metres indoors (Tbilisi 2016). The latter is the current national record.

International competitions

References

1993 births
Living people
Male long jumpers from Georgia (country)
Athletes (track and field) at the 2015 European Games
Athletes (track and field) at the 2016 Summer Olympics
Olympic athletes of Georgia (country)
European Games competitors for Georgia (country)
People from Samegrelo-Zemo Svaneti
Athletes (track and field) at the 2020 Summer Olympics